Limnonectes taylori is a species of frogs in the family Dicroglossidae, first described from Doi Inthanon, Thailand. It occurs in northwestern Thailand and into northern Laos and extreme east-central Myanmar, possibly into adjacent Vietnam. In Thailand, it occurs in the provinces Chiang Mai, Mae Hong Son, Lampang, Nan, and Tak.

References

Further reading
McLeod, David S., John K. Kelly, and Anthony Barley. ""Same-same but different": another new species of the Limnonectes kuhlii complex from Thailand (Anura: Dicroglossidae)." Russian Journal of Herpetology 19.3 (2012): 261-274.
McLeod, David S., Scuyler Kurlbaum, and Ngoc Van Hoang. "More of the same: a diminutive new species of the Limnonectes kuhlii complex from northern Vietnam (Anura: Dicroglossidae)." Zootaxa 3947.2 (2015): 201–214.
Matsui, Masafumi, et al. "A new tree frog of the genus Gracixalus from Thailand (Amphibia: Rhacophoridae)." Zoological Science 32.2 (2015): 204–210.
https://bangkokherps.wordpress.com/frogs/taylors-stream-frog/

taylori
Amphibians of Myanmar
Amphibians of Laos
Amphibians of Thailand
Frogs of Asia
Amphibians described in 2010